Following the release of the film E.T. the Extra-Terrestrial and its subsequent 20th-anniversary re-release, many video games across several platforms and genres have been developed based on its story and themes.

1982

E.T. the Extra-Terrestrial (Atari, 1982)

E.T. the Extra-Terrestrial was released in December of 1982, only releasing to a North American audience. The game was based on the original film released in the same year. Despite the popularity of the film, the game is widely considered to be one of the worst games of all time. It has been reviewed by YouTubers and websites such as The Angry Video Game Nerd and given a surprising 3.3 on Google. The game's problems stem from development being rushed at launch, only taking 5 weeks to develop. The game's poor quality is often blamed for the Video Game Crash of 1983 and was one of the main games found in the Atari video game burial.

1983

E.T. Go Home (UFI und sein gefährlicher Einsatz) (Atari, 1983)

E.T. Go Home is a 1983 video game for the Atari 2600. It was originally a European game known as UFI und sein gefährlicher Einsatz. Gameplay revolves around collecting spaceship parts in a maze while avoiding enemy aliens.

E.T. Phone Home! (Atari, 1983)
Released by Child-Ware for the Atari 8-bit family of computers in 1983, the graphics of which were designed by British game designer and artist, John O'Neill. Players control Elliot, who must search the neighborhood for pieces that E.T. wants to use to build his transmitter. Depending on the level, players might or might not need all the pieces to complete the game. It's also possible to communicate "telepathically" with E.T. to get a reminder of which pieces he is looking for.

As Elliot looks for the pieces, he is pursued by a number of men who are trying to stop him from completing his task. Once Elliot gets enough of the pieces, E.T. says his famous line "E.T. Phone Home". From there, players control E.T. trying to find his way back to the landing site in the forest. The game ends with E.T. returning to his spaceship before ascending into outer space.

E.T. the Extra-Terrestrial (1983) 
E.T. the Extra-Terrestrial is a 1983 video game for the TI-99/4A.

2001

E.T.: Digital Companion
Released for the Game Boy Color on October 18, 2001, this cartridge allows the Game Boy Color to be used as a child-friendly personal digital assistant. The E.T.: Digital Planner features an address book, a calendar, a clock, and a To-Do List. The software also contains five mini games, including a virtual pet, named the "Flopgopple". Information within the software can be protected with a password or by printing it out on the Nintendo Game Boy Printer.

E.T.: Escape from Planet Earth
Released for the Game Boy Color on November 28, 2001. Players must construct a communicator so that E.T. can return home, searching 60 environments for all the components needed to build it. In the process, players will have to evade capture by government agents and avoid traps set for them.

Players alternate playing as the strategic-minded Elliott or as E.T., who can use abilities such as levitation. The single-player game contains exploration, quest, and encounter gamemodes and three difficulty levels, as well as mini-quests that unlock tradable hidden items.

E.T. the Extra-Terrestrial
Released for the Game Boy Advance on December 14, 2001. Players must save E.T. from the government agents, scientists, and law enforcement officers that are trying to catch him while attempting to assemble a transmitter that will allow E.T. to phone home.

2002

E.T.: Interplanetary Mission

Released on March 27, 2002, in North America and on March 29, 2002, in Europe for the Microsoft Windows and Sony PlayStation on December 30, 2002, in North America and in 2002 in Europe. E.T. is on a mission to save the universe by collecting rare plants from planets with various climates and using E.T.'s glowing finger to recover their health. Gameplay involves solving puzzles as well as combat.

E.T. and the Cosmic Garden
Released for the Game Boy Color in March 2002, E.T. Cosmic Garden is a real-time adventure where you travel to six planets for the spaceship's greenhouse and fulfill E.T.'s original mission by replanting and restoring the Cosmic Garden. E.T. and his assistants, Space Bee and Space Slug maintain proper amounts of food, water, and light, and to protect these special species from a host of intergalactic pests, including space beetles, fungus, and harmful celestial events, such as a prolonged eclipse. E.T. can use his special telekinesis powers to control the pests.

Features 12 levels and seven environments. Players can create more than 60 plants, each with unique personalities and abilities. Completion of the game to unlocks the never-ending Prize Garden.

E.T.: Away from Home
Released for Microsoft Windows on March 27, 2002, for the 20th Anniversary of E.T.

E.T.: Phone Home Adventure
Released for Microsoft Windows on March 27, 2002, for the 20th Anniversary of E.T.

2012

E.T.: The Green Planet
Released for iOS on October 9, 2012, for the 30th Anniversary of E.T. It is a farming game in which the player plants seeds, waits for them to grow, and sells them for profit in order to upgrade their farm in the same style as many farming apps that were popular at the time, such as Farmville.

2015

Lego Dimensions (2015)

In the toys-to-life video game Lego Dimensions E.T. is included as a playable character and a purchasable real-life figure. On November 18, 2015, he was released in a pack containing E.T. himself and a "Phone Home" gadget. The use of his figure unlocks an E.T.-themed adventure map.

2017

E.T. Pinball (2017)
35 years after the film's release, Zen Studios developed and released a virtual pinball adaptation of it as one of three tables based on iconic Universal Pictures classic films created after Universal agreed to a partnership with Zen.  The table is available as a purchased, downloadable add-on for the game Pinball FX 3 and features 3-D animated figures of Elliot, E.T. and his spaceship.

Cancelled games
E.T.: Return to the Green Planet - PlayStation 2
E.T.: Search for Dragora - Nintendo GameCube, Xbox
E.T.: Salerian Project - Game Boy Advance

References